Angel Dust (stylized as Angel Du$t) is an American rock supergroup formed in Baltimore, Maryland in 2013, made up of members of Turnstile and Trapped Under Ice. They have released four albums. In 2018, they signed to Roadrunner Records. In 2019, Billboard noted them as one of the most important bands in broadening the scope of what hardcore punk is. Kerrang! included their 2019 album Pretty Buff as one of their "25 Best Albums of 2019" and  Loudwire named it one of the 50 best metal albums of 2019.

History

2013-2016: Early Years, A.D., and Rock the Fuck on Forever 
Angel Du$t was formed in 2013 by vocalist/songwriter Justice Tripp of Trapped Under Ice, guitarist Michael Quick, bassist Nicholas Heitman, drummer Daniel Fang of Turnstile, and guitarist Pat McCrory, who would also later go on to join Turnstile. The band released their demo Xtra Raw on April 8, 2013 via React! Records. In September/October 2013, the band supported Twitching Tongues on their On Tour There Is No Law US tour alongside Downpresser and select support from Turnstile and Stigmata. 

In February 2014, the band supported Turnstile on their US headlining tour alongside Diamond Youth, Turnover, and Blind Justice. On June 10, 2014, the band released their debut album A.D. via React! and Reaper Records.

On May 20, 2016, the band released their second album Rock the Fuck on Forever via Pop Wig Records, the label owned by Tripp, Fang, and Brendan Yates.

In October/November 2016, the band supported Turnstile on their Move Thru Me tour in the US alongside Big Bite and select support from Krimewatch, Fury, and Lock.

2017-2020: Yates joining and Pretty Buff 
In 2017, the band was joined by Turnstile vocalist Brendan Yates on drums.

On March 15, 2019, the band released their third album Pretty Buff via Roadrunner Records. This album brought a large stylistic change, shifting away from hardcore/punk music and more towards acoustic, power pop ballads. Most of the lyrical content was written about the passing of Tripp's dog, Spike. in June 2019, the band embarked on the second US leg of the Pretty Buff tour with support from Gouge Away and Giltterer.

In 2020, the band released the EP Lil House which featured songs that would later appear on the band's fourth album.

2021-present: Touring members and YAK 
As of 2021, Tripp is the sole founding and touring member of the band due to busy touring schedule of the other members' bands. Despite a rotating lineup of touring members, Tripp said all past and touring members contribute to the songwriting in the studio. In September/October 2021, the band supported Mannequin Pussy on their US tour alongside Pinkshift.

On October 22, 2021, the band released their fourth album YAK: A Collection of Truck Songs via Roadrunner Records.

In April/May 2022, the band embarked on a US headlining tour with support from Spiritual Cramp and Webbed Wing. In June 2022, the band supported PUP on their Thank Fucking God US tour alongside Oceanator. In June/July 2022, the band embarked on a co-headlining UK tour with Drug Church with support from Anxious. In September/October 2022, the band supported Movements on their US tour alongside One Step Closer and Snarls.

In February 2023, the band embarked on a triple co-headlining weekend tour with Drug Church and Fiddlehead. In May 2022, the band embarked on US headlining tour with support from Life's Question and Jivebomb.

Musical style
The band have been categorised as soft rock, pop rock, hardcore punk, and melodic hardcore. Their music often incorporates elements of surf rock, grunge, alternative rock and pop.

Their 2013 demo Xtra Raw was described by Kerrang! as a "scrappy, lo-fi bundle of punk", while their subsequent material was more melodic. Revolver magazine described the band's music as a "curve ball", due to its relationship to the hardcore scene, despite also including "heartfelt saxophone", "strummy acoustic guitar[s]" and "an overwhelming amount of positivity", and in another article as "about as catchy and fun as catchy and fun get". In an article for Clash, writer Robin Murray described their music as "between a rough-around-the-edges Lemonheads with Elvis Costello vocal melodies".

Many of the tracks on the band's 2019 album Pretty Buff were written about the death of Tripp's dog.

They cited influences including The Lemonheads, The Replacements, The Feelies, the Bad Brains, Violent Femmes and Greg Sage.

Members
Current members
Justice Tripp – lead vocals, acoustic guitar (2013–present)
Pat McCrory – lead guitar, backing vocals (2013–present)
Daniel Fang – drums (2013–present)
Brendan Yates – rhythm guitar, backing vocals (2017–present)

Former members

 Jeff Caffey - bass (2015-2020)
 Nicholas Heitman – bass (2013–2017)
 Michael "Cheddar" Quick – rhythm guitar (2013–2015)

 Touring members 
 Matthew Berry - guitar (2021)
 Tommy Cantwell - drums (2022-present)
 Taylor Madison - guitar (2022)
 Steve Marino - bass (2021-present)
 Kora Puckett - guitar (2021)
 Allen Trainer - drums (2021)

Discography

Studio albums

EPs
Lil House (2020)
Bigger House (2021)
Demos
Xtra Raw (2013)

Accolades

References

External links

Musical groups established in 2013
Musical groups from Baltimore
Hardcore punk groups from Maryland
Melodic hardcore groups
American pop rock music groups
2013 establishments in Maryland